Lesbian, gay, bisexual, and transgender (LGBT) persons in the British Overseas Territory of the Turks and Caicos Islands face legal challenges not experienced by non-LGBT residents. Same-sex sexual activity has been legal in the Turks and Caicos Islands since 2001, and discrimination based on sexual orientation is constitutionally banned.

Legality of same-sex sexual activity
Same-sex sexual acts were expressly decriminalised under the United Kingdom's Caribbean Territories (Criminal Law) Order, 2000, which took effect on 1 January 2001.

The law received considerable local media coverage. The two largest newspapers (one of each belongs to the two largest political parties) described the law as "an affront to our country" and "the sissy law".

The age of consent is higher for male (18) than it is for female (16).

Recognition of same-sex relationships

Same-sex marriages and civil unions are not legal in the Turks and Caicos Islands. Only opposite-sex marriage is constitutionally protected as Article 10 of the Constitution reads:
Every unmarried man and woman of marriageable age (as determined by or under any law) has the right to marry a person of the opposite sex and found a family.

Discrimination protections
Article 16 of the Constitution bans discrimination based on sexual orientation:
In this section, "discriminatory" means affording different treatment to different persons attributable wholly or mainly to their respective descriptions such as by race, national or social origin, political or other opinion, colour, religion, language, creed, association with a national minority, property, sex, sexual orientation, birth or other status whereby persons of one such description are subjected to disabilities or restrictions to which persons of another such description are not made subject or are accorded privileges or advantages which are not accorded to persons of another such description.

Living conditions
The Turks and Caicos Islands are considered a safe destination for LGBT tourists. LGBT people tend to face no discrimination issues in resorts and very touristic areas. Most Turks and Caicos inhabitants are quite tolerant of same-sex relationships. Several gay-themed cruise ships have also been allowed to port in the islands.

There are no known gay rights organisations in the Turks and Caicos Islands. Several government education programmes on HIV/AIDS have reached out to gay men, though.

Homophobia in the Turks and Caicos Islands is mostly religious-based. Following the passage of Proposition 8 in California, several religious preachers called on same-sex marriage to be constitutionally banned in island law. Religious groups have also opposed greater awareness and prevention of HIV/AIDS, erroneously claiming that straight men and women cannot get infected.

Summary table

See also

Politics of the Turks and Caicos Islands
British overseas territories
LGBT rights in the Commonwealth of Nations
LGBT rights in the Americas
LGBT rights by country or territory
LGBT rights in the United Kingdom
Recognition of same-sex unions in the British Overseas Territories

References

Turks and Caicos Islands
Turks and Caicos Islands
Politics of the Turks and Caicos Islands
Turks and Caicos Islands law